Tamsyn Leevey (born 24 January 1978, in Taumarunui, New Zealand) is a professional squash player from New Zealand. At the 2006 Commonwealth Games in Melbourne, Australia, she won a silver medal in the women's doubles, partnering Shelley Kitchen. Earlier in the year, Leevey and Kitchen won the women's doubles title at the World Doubles Squash Championships.

External links 
 
 Interview at New Zealand Academy of Sport website (from 2002)

1978 births
Living people
New Zealand female squash players
Commonwealth Games silver medallists for New Zealand
Squash players at the 2006 Commonwealth Games
Squash players at the 2010 Commonwealth Games
People from Taumarunui
Commonwealth Games medallists in squash
Medallists at the 2006 Commonwealth Games